The  Diagnostic Interview for Genetic Studies (DIGS) is a structured interview for psychiatric disorders designed by researchers from the National Institute of Mental Health, first published in 1991. Although most of the diagnoses were based on DSM-III-R criteria, the instrument was also able to generate diagnoses for certain disorders in other systems including DSM-IV, Research Diagnostic Criteria, ICD-10 and Feighner Criteria. This was possible because the instrument records symptoms in sufficient detail to allow different criteria to be applied.
The DIGS interview has gone through a number of revisions since being published. The latest version is DIGS 4.0/BP which was published in 2005. All DIGS versions are available to download from the NIMH Center for Collaborative Genomic Studies on Mental Disorders

See also
Diagnostic classification and rating scales used in psychiatry

References

External links
DIGS at NIMH Center for Collaborative Genomic Studies on Mental Disorders Manual for DIGS versions 1.0 to 4.0/BP may be downloaded from this website

Mental disorders screening and assessment tools
Medical classification